Zaid Tahseen (born 29 January 2001) is an Iraqi footballer who plays as a defender for Al-Talaba in the Iraqi Premier League.

International career
On 26 September 2022, Tahseen made his first international cap with Iraq against Syria in the 2022 Jordan International Tournament.

Honours

International
Iraq
 Arabian Gulf Cup: 2023

References

External links 
 

2001 births
Living people
Iraqi footballers
Iraq international footballers
Association football defenders